Mass No. 2 may refer to:

 Mass No. 2 (Bruckner), in E minor, by Anton Bruckner
 Mass No. 2 (Haydn), Missa brevis in F major, by Joseph Haydn
 Mass No. 2 (Mozart), Waisenhaus in C minor, by Wolfgang Amadeus Mozart
 Mass No. 2 (Schubert), in G major, by Franz Schubert